When Larry Met Mary is a 2016 Chinese romantic comedy film directed by Wen Zhang. It was released in China on July 15, 2016.

Plot

When Larry Met Mary follows the story of a shy and timid man, who has secretly loved his classmate for a long time and looking forward for a second chance.

Cast
Bao Bei'er
Song Jia
Zhu Yawen
Jiao Junyan
Guo Jingfei
Guo Tao
Ma Yili
Li Chen
Chen He
Chang Yuan
Bao Wenjing
Jiu Kong
Yu Shasha
Zhang Yiming
Wen Zhang
Alejandro Muñoz

Reception
The film has grossed  in China.

Awards and nominations

References

Chinese romantic comedy films
2016 romantic comedy films
Huayi Brothers films
Huaxia Film Distribution films
Flagship Entertainment films
2010s Mandarin-language films